Genazzano FCJ College is a Roman Catholic, day and boarding school for girls, located in Kew, an eastern suburb of Melbourne, Victoria, Australia.

Established in 1889 by the Faithful Companions of Jesus (FCJ Sisters), the college has a non-selective enrolment policy. In 2007,  the school catered for approximately 1,000 students from Early Learning Centre to Year 12, including 40 boarders from Years 8 to 12.

Genazzano is a member of the Association of Heads of Independent Schools of Australia (AHISA), the Association of Independent Schools of Victoria (AISV), the Alliance of Girls' Schools Australasia. and a founding member of Girls Sport Victoria (GSV).

History
Genazzano FCJ College was founded in 1889 as a boarding school for country girls by the order, Faithful Companions of Jesus (FCJ Sisters), specifically Marie Madeleine D'Houet, in honour of whom one of the schools houses is named, on its current site at Kew. The name is derived from the town Genazzano in Italy.

The Wardell Building is listed on the Victorian Heritage Register.

House system
As with most Australian schools, Genazzano utilises a house system. There are currently six houses named after people significant in the school's history:
     D'Houet (blue): Named after Marie Madeleine D'Houet, Foundress of FCJ Sisters.
     Stock (yellow): Named after Mother Stanislaus Stock, first Principal of Genazzano, 1889–1914.
     Gerda (green): Named after Mother Gerda Prytz, first Genazzano pupil to enter FCJ Society.
     Douglas (pink): Named after Mother Philomena Douglas, Principal of Genazzano, 1932–1958.
     Corry (red): Named after Ellen Corry, first pupil, first President of OGA (Past Pupils).
     Winter (white): Named after Mary Winter, honoured past pupil. The College Prize for Loyalty is still given in her honour.

The houses compete in Swimming, athletics, Cross Country, and the 'Genazzano Day' House Dance Competition.

Facilities
The current facilities of Genazzano FCJ College include: The original Wardell Building housing all Year 10 to 12 classrooms, specialist areas, the Chapel and the Madeleine Performing Arts Centre; The Physical Education Complex incorporating the Centenary Hall, which houses a 25-metre swimming pool and gymnasium; The D'Houet Building housing library and technology facilities, science laboratories and preparation areas, a Careers Centre, and a centre for VCE education with classrooms, tutorial rooms and conference facilities. This building incorporates the former library building which has been refurbished to include Food Technology facilities, cafeteria amenities and Year 5-7 classrooms; 'Grange Hill' is the location for Prep to Year 4 education housing a library complex, specialist areas and administrative facilities. The Early Learning Centre is also housed at Grange Hill and provides early childhood education for 3 and 4 year old girls and boys.

Sport 
Genazzano is a member of Girls Sport Victoria (GSV).

GSV premierships 
Genazzano has won the following GSV premierships.

 Basketball (2) - 2002, 2003
 Cricket (2) - 2002, 2003
 Cross Country - 2010
 Netball (5) - 2001, 2007, 2008, 2011, 2015
 Tennis (4) - 2002, 2003, 2011, 2012
 Triathlon, Sprint - 2020

Programs
Genazzano offers a rowing program for girls in years 8-12, competing in regattas across Victoria and at Head of the School Girls. At the 2010 Head of the School Girls Regatta, Genazzano took out 13 titles.

Senior students in Years 10 to 12 annually produce a musical with their counterparts at Xavier College.

Genazzano is an active member of GSV offering a variety of sports across the year and each term.

Participates in the Debating Association of Victoria's (DAV) Debating Competition.

Music lessons are offered as well as multiple opportunities to participate in bands, ensembles and orchestras.

Associated schools
Genazzano’s sister school FCJ College Benalla was founded in 1900 originally as an all girls boarding school. 
Genazzano's brother school is Xavier College in Kew. Xavier College and Genazzano have an active collaboration sharing musical productions and instrumental programs.
Genazzano also runs a yearly exchange with St Mary's School in Broome. Four Year Nine students are selected to go and immerse themselves in the Aboriginal culture.

In collaboration with brother school Xavier College, Genazzano FCJ College participates in a community outreach program in conjunction with the combined parishes of Our Lady of Good Counsel, Deepdene, Sacred Heart, Kew and Immaculate Conception, Hawthorn and lastly MLC, Kew. For the duration of one week, 12 students from the partnered schools participate in a community building program in Bourke, an outback town of New South Wales.

Notable alumnae
 Jane Kennedy – Actress, comedian and producer with Working Dog Productions
 Robyn Nevin AM – Actress; Artistic Director/CEO of the Sydney Theatre Company (also attended The Fahan School)
 Brenda Niall AO – Biographer, literary critic and journalist
 Belle Bruce Reid – first female veterinarian to qualify in Australia
 Julia Zaetta – Editor of Better Homes and Gardens, Pacific Magazines Pty Limited; Former Editorial Director of The Australian Women's Weekly
 Felicity Pia Hampel SC – Judge of the County Court of Victoria
 Cate Molloy – Member of the Legislative Assembly (Independent) for Noosa 2006; MLA (ALP) for Noosa 2001-06
 Sarah Banting - Coxswain of Australian Women's 8+ At 2016 RIO Olympics
 Dr Sarah McNab - Director of General Medicine, Royal Childrens Hospital, Melbourne
 Dr Judith Paphazy
 Mary Parker (Australian actress) (born Gloucestershire)
 Bernadette Tobin AO - ethicist

See also 
 List of schools in Victoria
 List of high schools in Victoria
 Victorian Certificate of Education
 List of boarding schools in Victoria

References

External links
 Genazzano FCJ College website
 FCJ Sisters – Australian website

Girls' schools in Victoria (Australia)
Educational institutions established in 1889
Boarding schools in Victoria (Australia)
Catholic secondary schools in Melbourne
Catholic boarding schools in Australia
Heritage-listed buildings in Melbourne
1889 establishments in Australia
Catholic primary schools in Melbourne
Alliance of Girls' Schools Australasia
Buildings and structures in the City of Boroondara